Ketan Garg (born 15 June 1999) is an Indian cricketer. He made his first-class debut for Arunachal Pradesh in the 2018–19 Ranji Trophy on 22 December 2018.

References

External links
 

1999 births
Living people
Indian cricketers
Arunachal Pradesh cricketers
Place of birth missing (living people)